Bailey Hall is the largest auditorium at Cornell University, seating 1324 people. It is named for Liberty Hyde Bailey, first dean of what is now Cornell's College of Agriculture and Life Sciences; it was originally built by New York State for the use of agriculture students, but also filled a need for a large auditorium for the whole university.

The building was constructed in 1912 according to the Greek Revival architecture design of Buffalo architect Edward Brodhead Green, an 1878 Cornell graduate. It is shaped as an amphitheatre, with a colonnaded portico wrapping around its south side, and monumental stairs leading up to 11-foot main doors.

Bailey Hall was added to the National Register of Historic Places in 1984.

Recent renovations
As originally configured, Bailey seated 1,948; one wag described it as "acoustics by God, seats by Torquemada," referring to its wooden seats and severely raked floor. In 2006, the building reopened after a major rehabilitation which brought it up to modern building codes and made it handicapped-accessible, albeit at the cost of several hundred seats of audience capacity.

The road and small parking lot immediately in front of Bailey were converted into a pedestrian plaza which was opened to the public in 2007. The flagstones of the plaza are hewn from bluestone, similar to the material used to construct the Stone Row on the Arts Quad. Some of the stones were thermally treated to alter their colors to achieve a cosmetic effect. The benches ringing the plaza extend to 30 feet in length, each having been hewn from a single Oregon Douglas fir. A fountain carved from local stone into a natural, sloping shape invoking Ithaca's gorges is featured on the southern edge of the plaza.

References

Cornell University buildings
School buildings completed in 1912
Tourist attractions in Tompkins County, New York
University and college buildings on the National Register of Historic Places in New York (state)
1912 establishments in New York (state)
National Register of Historic Places in Tompkins County, New York
Green & Wicks buildings